A mortarium (pl. "mortaria") was one of a class of Ancient Roman pottery kitchen vessels. They are "hemispherical or conical bowls, commonly with heavy flanges", and with coarse sand or grit embedded into the internal surface. They were used for pounding or mixing foods and are an important indicator of the spread of Romanized food preparation methods. Stamps on some early Roman mortaria record the name of the potter, from which it is possible to trace their movement between workshops. Some vessels produced in Italy and Gaul are transported long distances but local factories dominate at most periods.

Many fancy red mortaria had a small hole near the top to allow the discharge of liquids, which was artistically made to appear as the mouth of a lion, mouse, or bat.

Etymology 
The English word mortar derives from classical Latin mortarium, meaning, among several other usages, "receptacle for pounding" and "product of grinding or pounding". From mortar and pestle.

Sources 
 Potsherd

External links 

Ancient Roman pottery
Kitchenware